Cleistocactus winteri is a succulent of the family Cactaceae. Its common name is the golden rat tail. Cleistocactus winteri subsp. colademono, as its synonym Cleistocactus colademononis, has gained the Royal Horticultural Society's Award of Garden Merit.

Subspecies

Description
It has many short bristly golden spines that literally cover the surface of the stems. The plant requires water during the summer and to be kept dry in the winter. It reproduces by seeds and cuttings.

References

Trichocereeae
Cacti of South America
Flora of Argentina
Flora of Bolivia
Flora of Peru
Flora of Uruguay